Elachista wieseriella is a moth of the family Elachistidae which is endemic to Austria.

Etymology
The species is named in honour of Dr. Christian Wieser.

References

wieseriella
Moths described in 2000
Endemic fauna of Austria
Moths of Europe